Peter Alexander Bennett (born 22 March 1982) is an English television personality, actor and musician, who rose to fame after winning the seventh series of the Channel 4 reality series Big Brother in 2006. He has Tourette syndrome.

Career 
In 2006, Bennett was selected as one of the original 14 housemates for the seventh series. He won the series with 61.2% of the final vote.

The show was criticized by some, who said the series was exploiting his Tourette's syndrome. The Tourette Syndrome Association (TSA) initially expressed concern that those with the condition would be mocked, though they later softened their stance. A TSA spokesperson said the series "has put Tourette's on the map".

Later in 2006, Bennett was nominated for a National Television Award in 2006 for "Most Popular TV Contender"; however, this was awarded to fellow Big Brother contestant Nikki Grahame.

Bennett's autobiography, Pete: My Story, was published in hardback in November 2006 and reissued in paperback in 2007 as My Journey With Tourettes.

Bennett was also the lead singer in a band called Daddy Fantastic, but he left the band after agreeing with a record label that he should become a solo artist. He then wrote music with songwriter and record producer Guy Chambers. Bennett went on to form another band, Pete Bennett and the Love Dogs, which played at Glastonbury, and venues such as IndigO2 and The Cavern Club.

In 2013, he guest starred on the web series GIFTED in the pilot episode.

In 2016, he set up a cleaning business called Celebriclean.

Filmography

References

External links 
 

1982 births
Living people
Big Brother (British TV series) winners
British beatboxers
People from Camberwell
People from Brighton
People with Tourette syndrome